Woolly and Tig is a British series of 5-minute live action comedies about a five-year-old girl (Tig) and her toy spider called Woolly. Woolly and Tig is also available on BBC iPlayer for over a year.

The character of Tig is played by three year old Betsy McCredie; Dad is played by Colin McCredie (Betsy's actual father); Mum is played by Jenny Ryan (Betsy's Aunt) and the series is narrated by Maisie McCredie (Betsy's older sister).

One of the directors is Andrew Agnew, who played PC Plum in the children's series Balamory. Woolly and Tig is produced by Tattiemoon.

Summary
Each episode shows the main character, Tig Jameson, in a different situation, e.g. being afraid of thunder or staying away from home. Her toy spider, Woolly, helps her overcome these situations by telling her what to think. It then cuts to Tig sorting out these problems. The episode finishes with someone getting frightened by Woolly, and Tig saying "It's only a toy spider" and "I love Woolly".

Woolly is Tig's imaginary friend. He is actually a stuffed spider toy, although Tig imagines him as real. He also portrays Tig's conscience, and usually appears when Tig feels guilty, scared, or angry. Woolly is silly and likable. He is also funny, imaginative and energetic.

Episodes 
The BBC CBeebies page dedicated to the programme lists 30 episodes, with a summary of each.

 Series 1 (2012)
 Baby Ben
 The Funfair
 The Dance Class
 Hair Wash Day
 Losing Things
 First Day
 The Clown
 Eating New Foods
 Open Wide
 Timmy's Monsters
 One Step at a Time
 Fire Alarm
 Swing Park
 The Beard
 Changing My Room
 Museum of Imagination
 Sharing
 The Party
 The Painting Day
 Granny No No
 The Bus Ride
 Hospital
 Choosing
 Big Stomps
 Splash
 Busy
 Supermarket
 Hair Cut
 The Dog
 Sleepover
 Series 2 (2013)
 Sandcastle
 The Birthday Present
 Pandas
 Piano
 Echoes
 Getting Better
 Fussy
 I Don't Smile
 Waiting
 Flying
 Excited
 Funny Tummy
 The Hat
 Mountain
 Quiet
 Chuff
 My Favourite Dinosaur
 Dobbin
 Fireworks
 Holding Hands
 The Wedding
 Thunder
 Subway
 Rain
 Shadows
 Special episodes (10 minutes):
 Holiday Special: Hola (broadcast 26 August 2013)
 Halloween (broadcast 31 October 2013)
 Hogmanay (broadcast 31 December 2013)
 The Play (broadcast 26 February 2014)
 Going to School (broadcast 19 August 2014)
 Harvest Supper (broadcast 1 October 2014)
 Christmas Magic (broadcast 19 December 2014)

References

External links
 

BBC children's television shows
British preschool education television series
British television series with live action and animation
CBeebies